Howard Freeman (December 9, 1899 – December 11, 1967) was an American actor of the early 20th century, and film and television actor of the 1940s through the 1960s.

Biography 
Freeman was born in Helena, Montana, and began working as a stage actor in his 20s. He did not enter the film industry until he was over 40, in 1942, when he played a small uncredited role in Inflation. Despite his late start in film acting, Freeman would build himself a fairly substantial career in that field that would last over twenty three years. From 1943 onward he worked on a regular basis, sometimes in uncredited roles, but more often than not in small but credited bit or supporting parts. He appeared in ten films in 1943, and another eighteen from 1944 through 1945. In 1946 Freeman would appear in twelve films, the most notable of which was his first film of that year, Abilene Town, starring Randolph Scott and Lloyd Bridges, and California, starring Barbara Stanwyck and Ray Milland.

From 1947 through 1950 Freeman appeared in twenty films, and in 1951 he began appearing on numerous television series, which would be his main acting roles for the remainder of his career, lasting into 1965. He appeared in three episodes of Studio One, along with many other TV series, including Car 54, Where Are You? and Route 66. He retired from film and television acting in 1965, and settled into retirement in New York City, where he was living at the time of his death on December 11, 1967.

Broadway roles

 The Star-Wagon (1937) as Apfel
 Knickerbocker Holiday (1938) as Schermerhorn
 The Unconquered (1940) as Karp Morozov
 Liliom (1940) (revival) as policeman and as the richly dressed man

Selected filmography

 Margin for Error (1943) as Otto Horst
 The Human Comedy (1943) as Reverend Holly (uncredited)
 Slightly Dangerous (1943) as Mr. Quill
 Air Raid Wardens (1943) as J. P. Norton
 Hitler's Madman (1943) as Heinrich Himmler
 Pilot #5 (1943) as Governor Hank Durban
 Girl Crazy (1943) as Governor Tait
 Whistling in Brooklyn (1943) as Steve Conlon
 Madame Curie (1943) as Prof. Constant (voice, uncredited)
 Lost Angel (1943) as Professor Richards
 Rationing (1944) as Cash Riddle
 Once Upon a Time (1944) as McKenzie (uncredited)
 Meet the People (1944) as Mr. George Peetwick
 Mr. Winkle Goes to War (1944) as Mayor Williams (uncredited)
 Secret Command (1944) as Max Lessing
 The Mark of the Whistler (1944) as M. K. Simmons (uncredited)
 An American Romance (1944) as Jarrett's Associate (uncredited)
 The Unwritten Code (1944) as Mr. Norris
 Dancing in Manhattan (1944) as George Hartley
 Carolina Blues (1944) as Tom Gordon
 Meet Miss Bobby Socks (1944) as Tom Tyler
 A Song to Remember (1945) as Kalkbrenner
 Where Do We Go from Here? (1945) as Kreiger
 I'll Tell the World (1945) as Lester Westchester
 You Came Along (1945) as Drunk
 That Night with You (1945) as Wilbur Weedy
  This Love of Ours (1945) as Dr. Barnes
 Mexicana (1945) as Beagle
 Abilene Town (1946) as Ed Balder
 House of Horrors (1946) as Hal Ormiston
 The Blue Dahlia (1946) as Corelli
 So Goes My Love (1946) as Willis
 Inside Job (1946) as Mr. Winkle
 Night and Day (1946) as Max Fisher (uncredited)
 The Killers (1946) as Brentwood Police Chief (uncredited)
 Monsieur Beaucaire (1946) as King Philip II
 Swell Guy (1946) as Botsworth (uncredited)
 Susie Steps Out (1946) as Mr. Starr
 Cross My Heart (1946) as Wallace Brent
 California (1947) as Sen. Creel
 The Perfect Marriage (1947) as Peter Haggerty
 My Brother Talks to Horses (1947) as Hector Damson
 Easy Come, Easy Go (1947) as Magistrate (uncredited)
 Cigarette Girl (1947) as B. J. Halstead
 That Way with Women (1947) as Dr. Harvey
 The Long Night (1947) as Sheriff Ned Meade
 Magic Town (1947) as Nickleby
 Cass Timberlane (1947) as Hervey Plint
 If You Knew Susie (1948) as Mr. Clinton
 Summer Holiday (1948) as Mr. Peabody
 Arthur Takes Over (1948) as Bert Bixby
 Letter from an Unknown Woman (1948) as Herr Kastner
 Up in Central Park (1948) as Myron Schultz
 The Time of Your Life (1948) as Society Gentleman
 Give My Regards to Broadway (1948) as Mr. Waldron
 Cry of the City (1948) as Sullivan the Drunk (uncredited)
  The Girl from Manhattan (1948) as Sam Griffin
 The Snake Pit (1948) as Dr. Curtis
 Take One False Step (1949) as Dr. Markheim
 Chicago Deadline (1949) as Hotspur Shaner
 Perfect Strangers (1950) as Arthur Timkin
 Here Comes the Groom (1951) as Governor
 Double Dynamite (1951) as R. B. Pulsifer Sr.
 Scaramouche (1952) as Michael Vanneau
 The Turning Point (1952) as Fogel
 Million Dollar Mermaid (1952) as Aldrich
 Remains to Be Seen (1953) as Clark
 Raiders of the Seven Seas (1953) as Mayor Pompaño
 Dear Brigitte (1965) as Dean Sawyer

External links 

 
 

1899 births
1967 deaths
American male film actors
American male stage actors
People from Helena, Montana
20th-century American male actors